Nils Weyer Arveschoug (1807–1894) was a Norwegian lawyer and politician.  He was the county governor of Nordlands amt from 1848 until 1853. He was then appointed to the post of county governor of Romsdals amt from 1853 until 1893, making him the longest-serving governor in history in Norway.

References

1807 births
1894 deaths
County governors of Norway
County governors of Nordland